Scaphism (from Greek , meaning "boat"), also known as the boats, is an alleged ancient Persian method of execution mentioned by Plutarch in his Life of Artaxerxes. It ostensibly entailed trapping the victim between two boats, feeding and covering them with milk and honey, and allowing them to fester and be devoured by insects and other vermin over time.

Historical descriptions
The first mention of scaphism is Plutarch's description of the execution of the soldier Mithridates, given as punishment by king Artaxerxes II for killing his brother Cyrus the Younger, who had rebelled in an attempt to claim the throne of the Achaemenid Empire:

The 12th-century Byzantine chronicler Joannes Zonaras later described the punishment, based on Plutarch:

In fiction

 In Shakespeare's The Winter's Tale, the rogue Autolycus falsely tells the shepherd and his son that because Perdita has fallen in love with the prince, her adoptive father will be stoned, while her adoptive brother will be subjected to the following punishment: "He has a son,—who shall be flayed alive; then 'nointed over with honey, set on the head of a wasp's nest; then stand till he be three quarters and a dram dead; then recovered again with aqua-vitae or some other hot infusion; then, raw as he is, and in the hottest day prognostication proclaims, shall he be set against a brick wall, the sun looking with a southward eye upon him,—where he is to behold him with flies blown to death."  
 In H. Rider Haggard's The Ancient Allan the protagonist Allan Quatermain experiences a vision of one of his past lives, in which he was a great Egyptian hunter named Shabaka. At one time he is condemned to "death by the boat" by the "King of kings" because of a hunting bet they had made. When Shabaka asks what is to happen to him, he is told by a eunuch "This, O Egyptian slayer of lions. You will be laid upon a bed in a little boat upon the river and another boat will be placed over you, for these boats are called the Twins, Egyptian, in such a fashion that your head and your hands will project at one end and your feet at the other. There you will be left, comfortable as a baby in its cradle, and twice every day the best of food and drink will be brought to you. Should your appetite fail, moreover, it will be my duty to revive it by pricking your eyes with the point of a knife until it returns. Also after each meal I shall wash your face, your hands and your feet with milk and honey, lest the flies that buzz about them should suffer hunger, and to preserve your skin from burning by the sun. Thus slowly you will grow weaker and at length fall asleep. The last one who went into the boat—he, unlucky man, had by accident wandered into the court of the House of Women and seen some of the ladies there unveiled—only lived for twelve days, but you, being so strong, may hope to last for eighteen."
 In The Venture Bros. episode "The Bellicose Proxy" a variation of this torture is described with tubs in place of boats.
 In Instinct, Season 2 Episode 5 "Ancient History", a victim of this torture is shown.
 In Your Pretty Face is Going to Hell'''s Season 4 episode Milk and Honey'' this torture (and a demon in the business of selling the boats used for it) is prominent.
 Blindboy Boatclub's short story "Scaphism" describes a murder committed using this method.

References

External links
Traité des instruments de martyre et des divers modes de supplice employés par les paiens contre les chrétiens 
BREWER: Dictionary of Phrase and Fable, Scaphism
Artaxerxes by Plutarch
Lexicon Universale, Historiam Sacram Et Profanam Omnis aevi, omniumque Gentium (Late Latin/some Greek)
Tortures and Torments of the Christian Martyrs

Capital punishment
Execution methods
Ancient instruments of torture
Asian instruments of torture